Harry Boyle may refer to:
Harry Boyle (cricketer) (1847–1907), Australian cricketer
Harry J. Boyle (1915–2005), Canadian broadcaster and writer
Henry Boyle (baseball) (1860–1932), "Handsome Harry"
Harry Boyle (footballer) (1924–2012), Scottish footballer and manager
Harry Boyle, a character in Wait Till Your Father Gets Home

See also
Henry Boyle (disambiguation)
Harold Boyle (1911–1974), American journalist
Harry Boyles (1911–2005), American baseball player